Mohin Ekhon O Bondhura is a Bengali EP album by Tapas Das, Lagnajita Chakraborty, Malabika Brahma, Titas Bhramar Sen. It was released on 6 October in 2015 by DBS Music in India. The album consists of five songs and a tribute albums to Moheener Ghoraguli, was an Indian Bengali rock band.

Tracklist

Personnel 
 Tapas Das – vocal, composer
  Titas Bhramar Sen – vocal
 Lagnajita Chakraborty – vocal
 Malabika Brahma – vocal
 Bidesh Basu – vocal
 Suddhasatta Mitra – vocals
 Gautam Chattopadhyay – composer (posthumous) 
 Pradip Chatterjee – flute
 Dhurba Basu Roy – guitar, music arrangement

References

External links 

 

2015 albums
Moheener Ghoraguli tribute albums